Böyük Dəkkə (also, Bëyuk Dekkya) is a village in the Zardab Rayon of Azerbaijan.  The village forms part of the municipality of İsaqbağı.

References 

 (as Bëyuk Dekkya)

Populated places in Zardab District